The Judicial College, formerly the Judicial Studies Board (JSB), established in 1979, is the organisation responsible for training judges in county, the Crown, and higher courts in England and Wales and tribunal judges in England and Wales, Scotland and Northern Ireland. This includes the training of magistrates and the chairmen and members of tribunals. The current chairman is Lady Justice Anne Rafferty, DBE. The name changed from Judicial Studies Board to Judicial College on 1 April 2011.

An essential element of the philosophy of the Judicial College is that the training of judges and magistrates is under judicial control and direction. A circuit judge, currently Andrew Hatton, is seconded to the Judicial College as Director of Training for Courts. Employment Judge Christa Christensen is seconded as the Director of Training for Tribunals. They are also the Joint Deans of the Faculty of the Judicial College.

Roberts, a legally-trained criminologist who studies forensic science, argues that decisions surrounding the admissibility of expert evidence in English Law are mostly governed by soft law based on advice by the Judicial College and various professional associations.

Guidelines for the Assessment of General Damages in Personal Injury Cases 

The Judicial College produces a book called the Guidelines for the Assessment of General Damages in Personal Injury Cases, which is published by Oxford University Press. As of April 2022 there have been 16 editions of this book. All judges hearing cases involving personal injury automatically receive a copy of this book.

The book was prepared by a working group under the chairmanship of Judge Roger Cox to address the problem of deciding damages in personal injury claims, and was designed to "distil the conventional wisdom found in reported cases", but was not intended as a "different approach to the problem". It contains no references to the reported cases on which it is based. These guidelines do not form part of law but are referred to by judges when awarding damages.

A similar publication in Ireland is available free of charge on the internet. In other countries, commercial publications such as "Personal Injury Damages" in Canada perform a similar role.

References

External links

 Home page

Law of the United Kingdom
Judiciaries of the United Kingdom
Education in the United Kingdom
Legal organisations based in the United Kingdom
Legal education in the United Kingdom
1979 establishments in the United Kingdom